Kasper Ødum (born 17 March 1979) is a male badminton player from Denmark.

Career

Titles
In 1999 he won the Bulgarian International, in 2000 the Austrian International, in 2003 the Polish Open, in 2005 the Bitburger Open International, and in 2006 the Southern PanAm International, the Belgian International and the Bulgarian Open.

References

External links
BWF Profile

1979 births
Living people
Danish male badminton players
Place of birth missing (living people)